Sonny Boy or Sunny Boy may refer to:

In music
"Sonny Boy" (song), a 1928 song written by Ray Henderson, Bud De Sylva, and Lew Brown
Sonny Boy (album), a 1961 album by jazz saxophonist Sonny Rollins featuring the above song

Film and television
Sonny Boy (1929 film), an American film
Sonny Boy (1989 film), starring Paul L. Smith and David Carradine
Sonny Boy (2011 film), a Dutch film
Sonny Boy (TV series), a Japanese anime television series

People
Sonny Boy Jaro (born 1982), Filipino professional boxer, former WBC Flyweight World Champion
Sonny Boy Nelson (1908–1998), American blues musician
Sonny Boy West (1929–1950), American professional boxer
Sonny Boy Williamson I (1914–1948), American blues harmonica player John Lee Curtis Williamson
Sonny Boy Williamson II (died 1965), American blues harmonica player Aleck Ford "Rice" Miller, unrelated to the above
Brian Roy Goble (1957–2014), Canadian singer and musician also known as "Sunny Boy"
Sunny Boy (rapper) (born 1983), Namibian rapper Sunday Shipushu

Other uses
"Sonny Boy" (short story), a P. G. Wodehouse short story from Eggs, Beans and Crumpets
Sunny Boy Cereal, a brand of porridge
Sunnyboy, a brand of flavoured ice block